The 2015 ABC Supply 500 was an IndyCar Series event that was contested at Pocono Raceway in Long Pond, Pennsylvania. The race served as the penultimate race of the 2015 IndyCar Series season, and was the third and final leg of the season's Fuzzy's Ultra Premium Vodka IndyCar Triple Crown.

The race was won by Ryan Hunter-Reay driving the No. 28 DHL Dallara-Honda for Andretti Autosport. It was marred, however, by a crash involving Sage Karam twenty one laps from the finish that resulted in Justin Wilson being hit by the nose cone from Karam's car and suffering a fatal head injury. Wilson died the next day on August 24, 2015.

Background
The race was run on Sunday, August 23, 2015.

Recap
The pole position was won by Hélio Castroneves of Team Penske, driving the No. 3 car. Penske Chevrolets qualified in the first three positions, with Castroneves' teammate Simon Pagenaud starting alongside him in the No. 22 and defending series champion Will Power behind him in position three.

Karam, driving a Chevrolet for Chip Ganassi Racing, qualified 20th, with Wilson seventh and Hunter-Reay eighth. Overall, twenty-four drivers qualified for the race.

Castroneves would eventually crash out of the event, finishing sixteenth. Wilson was scored in fifteenth, with Karam one position in front of him. The highest finishing of the Penske cars was the No. 2 of series points leader Juan Pablo Montoya, as he finished in third to receive a spot on the podium. Josef Newgarden, driving the No. 67 Chevrolet for CFH Racing, took the other position on the podium by way of his second-place finish and finished with a race-high 47 laps led. He was followed by Gabby Chaves, who led 31 laps in the No. 98 Honda for Bryan Herta Autosport, and Pagenaud, who led 30 laps. Hunter-Reay, Castroneves, and Tony Kanaan each led more than 20 laps.

There were 12 caution periods for 74 laps, and the race ended under the yellow flag. Eleven cars were running at the finish, with each being on the lead lap except for Pippa Mann, whose No. 18 Dale Coyne Racing Honda was running in thirteenth place fifteen laps down.

Broadcasting
NBCSN and the Indianapolis Motor Speedway Radio Network provided coverage of the event on television and radio respectively. Leigh Diffey called the race on television with Steve Matchett and Paul Tracy providing analysis. Matchett – Diffey's colleague from NBCSN's coverage of Formula One – was substituting for Townsend Bell, whose commitments to his United SportsCar Championship team took him to Virginia International Raceway that day where he finished first in his classification at the Oak Tree Grand Prix.

Paul Page headed the IMS booth with analyst Davey Hamilton, with Mark Jaynes and Jake Query reporting from the track.

Fatal accident

On lap 180 of the event, Karam was leading when he lost control of his car in turn one and made contact with the wall. The impact tore away most of the front end of Karam's car and he slid to a stop just past the exit to Turn 1. The nose cone of the Chevrolet came off with such force that it was bouncing along on the track as the drivers drove past. When Wilson, running fourteenth, drove by the scene, Karam's nose cone struck him in the head and knocked him unconscious. Wilson's No. 25 Honda lost control and veered off track, hitting the inner wall just past Turn 1 and continuing to slide up the track.

Karam, though shaken up, was able to exit his car with no major injuries. Wilson, however, was unresponsive when the track safety crew arrived at his machine and he had to be extricated from the car. A medivac helicopter was called for and transported Wilson to Lehigh Valley Hospital–Cedar Crest in nearby Allentown. He was reported to be in a coma with a severe head injury and was listed in critical condition. At approximately 21:00 local time on August 24, 2015, a press conference at Indianapolis Motor Speedway announced that Wilson had died from his injuries at the age of 37.

Wilson was the first IndyCar driver to lose his life since Dan Wheldon's fatal accident at the 2011 IZOD IndyCar World Championship in Las Vegas. His death was the second such occurrence in the world of open-wheel racing in 2015, following the death of Marussia F1 driver Jules Bianchi nine months after suffering a diffuse axonal injury in a crash at the 2014 Japanese Grand Prix.

Results

Qualifying

Race

References

External links

ABC Supply 500
ABC Supply 500
Motorsport in Pennsylvania
Pocono Mountains
ABC Supply 500